Marymount High School is an all-girls school in Highgate, St Mary, Jamaica. It was established in 1935 by sisters of the Franciscan Order. It has 840 students.

Notable alumni
Audrey Marks, ambassador

References

External links
Photos: Main entrance, Classroom block
Aerial view

Girls' schools in Jamaica
Buildings and structures in Saint Mary Parish, Jamaica
Educational institutions established in 1935
1935 establishments in Jamaica